Justina Vail Evans (née Vail, previously credited as Justina Vail) (born 20 August 1963) is a British actress, life coach, author and hypnotherapist.

Early life
Vail Evans was born in Kuala Lumpur, Malaysia in 1963 to British parents. She moved to Hong Kong in 1971 and to England in 1975 where she attended Beechwood Sacred Heart School and the Kent Institute of Art & Design (formerly Canterbury College of Art) to study fine art. She acquired her first acting role in Hong Kong where a British television show was filming.

Career
Vail Evans is co-owner and Director of Training at Envision Coach Training, an executive coach training program accredited by the International Coach Federation (ICF). She is an ICF Master Certified Coach (MCC) and provides life coaching, executive coaching, hypnotherapy and neuro-linguistic programming (NLP) in her private practice.

Vail Evans retired as an actor in 2001 in order to pursue her current career. Her most notable acting role was as a Russian scientist Dr. Olga Vukavitch in the late 1990s and early 2000s UPN science fiction television series Seven Days. Vail received positive reviews for her performance on the show. In 2000, she won a Saturn Award for best supporting actress, winning out over Stargate SG-1s Amanda Tapping. In 2001, however, there were reports of dissatisfaction on set. Co-star Don Franklin expressed his dissatisfaction with the show, and Vail was reported to have left the show entirely (according to some show sources over a dispute with Seven Days co-star Jonathan LaPaglia), only to later return and finish the third season.

She also acted in X Files, as the Unholy Spirit.

Vail Evans also guest-starred in an episode of Highlander: The Series. The episode (along with several others like it) were attempts to pilot female immortal leads for the short-lived Highlander: The Raven. Reviews of the episode were mixed, offering criticism of Vail's character but not her performance. Ultimately, Vail's character was not the one chosen for the new show.

Personal life
Vail Evans is married to Dr. Jeff Evans, author and CEO of Envision Global Leadership. Vail Evans is also an author. She has been a recurring columnist for Backstage magazine, and in 2012 she published her book How to be a Happy Actor in a Challenging Business: A Guide to Thriving Through it All. It was awarded the top prize of the "How To" category for the 2012 Hollywood Book Festival.

Filmography

Bibliography
How to Be a Happy Actor in a Challenging Business: A Guide to Thriving Through It All, CreateSpace, 2012,

References

External links

1963 births
Actresses from Los Angeles
Alumni of the University for the Creative Arts
British actresses
Living people
People from Kuala Lumpur
Life coaches
Malaysian expatriates in England
Malaysian people of British descent
21st-century American women